Gwangju High School is a high school in Dong-gu district, Gwangju, South Korea. It was established in 1951.

References

External links
Official website 

High schools in South Korea
Schools in Gwangju
Educational institutions established in 1951
1951 establishments in South Korea
Boys' schools in South Korea